Josephine Sumulong Cojuangco Reyes (November 26, 1927 – July 26, 2011) was a Filipina educator. She served as the seventh president of the Far Eastern University (FEU) in Manila, Philippines from 1985 to 1989. She also served as the chair of the board of trustees of the Far Eastern University - Dr. Nicanor B. Reyes Medical Foundation.

Education and family background
Cojuangco-Reyes earned her A.B. degree at Marymount College, New York, her M.A. in Education degree Columbia University, New York, and her Ed.D. at the Far Eastern University Manila. She finished her Doctor of Philosophy at the University of New Jersey in 1984.

Personal life
She was married to Nicanor M. Reyes, Jr., eldest son of FEU's founder. They had four children, Marie Therese, Nicanor III, Joaquin Jose, and Enrique Robert. She was the elder sister of former Philippine President Corazon S. Cojuangco-Aquino and Tarlac former Representative Jose Cojuangco Jr. Her nephew, Benigno S. Aquino III was former President of the Philippines. She was the daughter of the late Representative Jose C. Cojuangco of Tarlac and the late Demetria Sumulong of Antipolo, Rizal. She is the grandmother of Bianca L. Reyes, currently known as Sophie Albert and Dr. Nicanor J. Reyes, IV Resident Urologist of FEU Hospital.

Sister's death
Her younger sister Corazon C. Aquino died of cardiorespiratory arrest on August 1, 2009.

Death
Cojuangco-Reyes died on 26 July 2011, shortly after collapsing following her eulogy during the funeral of her elder brother Pedro.

Board memberships 
 Director and Vice-president, Central Azucarera de Tarlac
 President, Luisita Realty Corporation

References

External links
Far Eastern University - Nicanor Reyes Medical Foundation Official Website
Far Eastern University - School of Medicine Alumni Foundation Official Website

1927 births
2011 deaths
Filipino educators
Cojuangco family
People from Intramuros
Women heads of universities and colleges
Marymount College, Tarrytown alumni
Teachers College, Columbia University alumni
Far Eastern University alumni
Presidents of universities and colleges in the Philippines
Filipino academic administrators
Filipino women academics
20th-century women scientists
20th-century Filipino philosophers